Chaenomeles is a genus of four species of deciduous spiny shrubs, usually 1–3 m tall, in the family Rosaceae. They are native to Southeast Asia. These plants are related to the quince (Cydonia oblonga) and the Chinese quince (Pseudocydonia sinensis), differing in the serrated leaves that lack fuzz, and in the flowers, borne in clusters, having deciduous sepals and styles that are connate at the base.

The leaves are alternately arranged, simple, and have a serrated margin. The flowers are 3–4.5 cm diameter, with five petals, and are usually bright orange-red, but can be white or pink; flowering is in late winter or early spring. The fruit is a pome with five carpels; it ripens in late autumn.

Chaenomeles is used as a food plant by the larvae of some Lepidoptera species including the brown-tail and the leaf-miner Bucculatrix pomifoliella.

Common names
Although all quince species have flowers, gardeners in the West often refer to these species as "flowering quince", since Chaenomeles are grown ornamentally for their flowers, not for their fruits. These plants have also been called "Japanese quince", and the name "japonica" (referring to C. japonica) was widely used for these plants in the 19th and 20th centuries, although this common name is not particularly distinctive, since japonica is a specific epithet shared by many other plants. The names "japonica" or "Japanese quince" were (and still are) often loosely applied to Chaenomeles in general, regardless of their species. The most commonly cultivated Chaenomeles referred to as "japonica" are actually the hybrid C. × superba and C. speciosa; C. japonica itself is not as commonly grown.

Species and hybrids

Four named hybrids have been bred in gardens. The most common is C. × superba (hybrid C. speciosa × C. japonica), while C. × vilmoriniana is a hybrid C. speciosa × C. cathayensis, and C. × clarkiana is a hybrid C. japonica × C. cathayensis. The hybrid C. × californica is a tri-species hybrid (C. × superba × C. cathayensis). Numerous named cultivars of all of these hybrids are available in the horticultural trade.

Uses

The species have become popular ornamental shrubs in parts of Europe and North America, grown in gardens both for their bright flowers and as a spiny barrier. Some cultivars grow up to 2 m tall, but others are much smaller and creeping. The fruits are hard and – although less astringent than quinces – are unpleasant to eat raw, tasting like an unripe apple with the acidity of a lemon, though they do soften and become less astringent after frost (via the process of bletting).  The fruits are suitable for making liqueurs, as well as marmalade and preserves, as they contain more pectin than apples and true quinces. The tree is suitable for cultivation as a bonsai.

References

External links
 Chaenomeles speciosa entry in Plants for a Future database
 University of Arkansas Division of Agriculture: Flowering Quince, Japonica: ''Chaenomeles speciosa

 
Japanese fruit
Maleae
Plants used in bonsai
Rosaceae genera